Tavakanovo (Täwäkän) is a rural locality (a village) and the administrative centre of Tlyaumbetovsky Selsoviet, Kugarchinsky District, Bashkortostan, Russia. The population was 581 as of 2010. There are 9 streets.

Geography 
Tavakanovo is located 38 km southwest of Mrakovo (the district's administrative centre) by road. Progress is the nearest rural locality.

References 

Rural localities in Kugarchinsky District